Irshad English School at Irshad Nagar, Melattur, Kerala is an English school. It was started in 1992; Irshad has now to a full-fledged secondary school with classes up to Xth standard and an intake of around 700 students. The school was affiliated with CBSE, Delhi in 2006.

It is the only CBSE recognized school in Melattur, Kizhattur, and Vettathur area.

Administration 
The school is Run by the administration of Islamic Service Trust, Kozhikod..

Location
 Melattur, Kerala (Location of the school)
 Edappatta (Neighbouring Panchayath)

External links
 Orkut Community

References

Schools in Malappuram district
Educational institutions established in 1992
1992 establishments in Kerala